Petreşti may refer to:

Petrești, Dâmbovița, a commune in Dâmboviţa County, Romania
Petreşti, Satu Mare, a commune in Satu Mare County, Romania
Petreşti, a village in Coșești Commune, Argeș County, Romania
Petreşti, a village in Pânceşti Commune, Bacău County, Romania
Petreşti, a village in Mintiu Gherlii Commune, Cluj County, Romania
Petreşti, a village in Corbii Mari Commune, Dâmboviţa County, Romania
Petreşti, a village in Bărbăteşti Commune, Gorj County, Romania
Petreşti, a village in Burjuc Commune, Hunedoara County, Romania
Petreşti, a village in Golăiești Commune, Iaşi County, Romania
Petreşti, a village in Corbeanca Commune, Ilfov County, Romania
Petreşti, a village in Vânatori Commune, Vrancea County, Romania
Petreşti, a district in the city of Sebeş, Alba County, Romania
Petreşti, Ungheni, a commune in Ungheni district, Moldova

See also 
 Petre (disambiguation)
 Petreni (disambiguation)
 Petreasa (disambiguation)